The CLC-3 is a low altitude, mobile air defense radar that uses phased array and pulse doppler technologies to detect low flying targets such as helicopters and UAVs.

The manufacturer of the system is Nanjing Research Institute of Electronics Technology (NRIET)/Nanjing Institute No. 1

External links
NRIET

Ground radars
Military radars of the People's Republic of China